Jeff Cheeger (born December 1, 1943, Brooklyn, New York City) is a mathematician. Cheeger is professor at the Courant Institute of Mathematical Sciences at New York University in New York City.  His main interests are differential geometry and its connections with topology and analysis.

Biography
Cheeger graduated from Harvard University with a B.A. in 1964. He graduated from Princeton University with an M.S. in 1966 and with a PhD in 1967.  He is a Silver Professor at the Courant Institute at New York University where he has worked since 1993.

He worked as a teaching assistant and research assistant at Princeton University from 1966–1967, a National Science Foundation postdoctoral fellow and instructor from 1967–1968, an assistant professor from 1968 to 1969 at the University of Michigan, and an associate professor from 1969–1971 at SUNY at Stony Brook. Cheeger was a professor at SUNY, Stony Brook from 1971 to 1985, a leading professor from 1985 to 1990, and a distinguished professor from 1990 until 1992.

Cheeger has also had a number of visiting positions in Brazil (1971), at the Institute for Advanced Study (1972, 1977, 1978, 1995), Harvard University (1972), the Institut des Hautes Études Scientifiques (1984–1985) and the Mathematical Sciences Research Institute (1985).

He has supervised at least 13 doctoral theses and three postdoctoral fellows. He has served as a member of several American Mathematical Society committees and National Science Foundation panels.

Cheeger delivered invited addresses at the International Congress of Mathematicians in 1974 and in 1986.

He received the Guggenheim Fellowship in 1984. In 1998 Cheeger was elected a foreign member of the Finnish Academy of Science and Letters.

Cheeger was elected a member of the United States National Academy of Sciences in 1997. His election citation read:

Cheeger has discovered many of the deepest results in Riemannian geometry, such as estimates for the spectrum of the Laplace-Beltrami operator, and the identity of the analytic and geometric definitions of torsion, and has led to the solution of problems in topology, graph theory, number theory, and Markov processes.

He received the fourteenth Oswald Veblen Prize in Geometry from the American Mathematical Society in 2001.

Honors and awards

 1967-1968 National Science Foundation Postdoctoral Fellow
 1971–1973 Sloan Fellowship
 1974 Invited Speaker on the International Congress of Mathematicians
 1978 Invited Address, Annual Meeting of AMS
 1984–1985 Guggenheim fellowship
 1986 Invited Speaker on the International Congress of Mathematicians
 1992–1994 Max Planck Research Award, Alexander von Humboldt Society
 1997 Member of the United States National Academy of Sciences
 2001 Oswald Veblen Prize in Geometry
 2012 Fellow of the American Mathematical Society
 2019 Steele Prize for Lifetime Achievement
 2021 Shaw Prize (jointly with Jean-Michel Bismut)

Selected publications

 Cheeger, Jeff; Kleiner, Bruce.  On the differentiability of Lipschitz maps from metric measure spaces to Banach spaces.  Inspired by S. S. Chern,  129–152, Nankai Tracts kn Mathematics. 11, World Science Publications, Hackensack, N.J., 2006.
 Differentiability of Lipschitz functions on metric measure spaces.  Geometric and Functional Analysis. 9  (1999), no. 3, 428–517.
 Lower bounds on Ricci curvature and the almost rigidity of warped products, with T. H. Colding. Annals of Mathematics. 144. 1996. 189–237.
 On the cone structure at infinity of Ricci flat manifolds with Euclidean volume growth and quadratic curvature decay, with Gang Tian. Inventiones Mathematicae. 118. 1994. 493–571.
 Collapsing Riemannian manifolds while keeping their curvature bounded, II, with Mikhail Gromov. Journal of Differential Geometry. 31, 4. 1990. 269–298. Collapsing manifold
 Eta-invariants and their adiabatic limits, with J. M. Bismut. Journal of American Mathematical Society, 2, 1. 1989. 33–70.
Cheeger, Jeff; Gromov, Mikhail; Taylor, Michael Finite propagation speed, kernel estimates for functions of the Laplace operator, and the geometry of complete Riemannian manifolds.  Journal of Differential Geometry.  17  (1982), no. 1, 15–53.
 On the Hodge theory of Riemannian pseudomanifolds. American Mathematical Society: Proceedings of the Symposium in Pure Mathematics. 36. 1980. 91–146. L² cohomology
 Analytic torsion

 Cheeger, Jeff; Gromoll, Detlef. The splitting theorem for manifolds of nonnegative Ricci curvature.  Journal of Differential Geometry. 6 (1971/72), 119–128. Splitting theorem
 A lower bound for the smallest eigenvalue of the Laplacian.  Problems in analysis (Papers dedicated to Salomon Bochner, 1969),  pp. 195–199. Princeton University Press, Princeton, N.J., 1970. Cheeger constant
 Cheeger, Jeff; Gromoll, Detlef. The structure of complete manifolds of nonnegative curvature.  Bulletin of the American Mathematical Society. 74  1968 1147–1150.  Soul theorem
 Cheeger, Jeff. Finiteness theorems for Riemannian manifolds.  American Journal of Mathematics.  92  (1970) 61–74.
 Cheeger, Jeff; Ebin, David G.  Comparison theorems in Riemannian geometry.  Revised reprint of the 1975 original. AMS Chelsea Publishing, Providence, RI, 2008.

See also
 Cheeger bound
 Cheeger constant
 Cheeger constant (graph theory)
 Cheeger–Müller theorem
 soul theorem
 splitting theorem
 Collapsing manifold
 L² cohomology
 Riemannian geometry

References

External links
CV
 

Harvard University alumni
Princeton University alumni
1943 births
Living people
University of Michigan faculty
20th-century American mathematicians
21st-century American mathematicians
Differential geometers
Members of the United States National Academy of Sciences
Fellows of the American Mathematical Society
Courant Institute of Mathematical Sciences faculty
Sloan Research Fellows
Mathematicians from New York (state)
People from Brooklyn